Lamber Goodnow Injury Lawyers is a legal team known for their work on implementing virtual reality (VR) technology for use in court cases in the United States.

Virtual reality

Lamber Goodnow Injury Lawyers specialize in personal injury and wrongful death claims. The group has been implementing VR in a number of cases to help transport judges and juries into recreated scenes such as crash sites. Accident scenes are translated into a 3D experience for Oculus Rift by a group of engineers and legal experts at the production company Kitchen Sink Studios, which reenacts collisions based on police records, victim stories, and witness statements. Lamber Goodnow Injury Lawyers use the technology to protect the rights of their clients by helping jury members to understand in the best way possible what really happened in a case.

Other technology

Aside from VR, the team has implemented several recent technological advances in a legal context.

They use 3D printers to provide jurors with tangible objects highlighting issues such as product defects. They found two new uses for Google Glass: determining which arguments are most compelling with focus groups; and loaning them to clients, so they can record a day in their lives post-injury. Instead of traditional demand letters proposing out-of-court settlements, they send iPads preloaded with a demand video.

Practice and offices

The Lamber Goodnow Injury Lawyers team developed within Fennemore Craig. They have offices in Phoenix, Denver and Chicago.

References

External links
 

Virtual reality